Aleksandr Aleksandrovich Galkin (born 1 February 1979) is a Russian chess player. Born in Rostov-on-Don, he was awarded the title Grandmaster by FIDE in 1997.

Chess career 
Galkin won the 1999 World Junior Chess Championship. This victory qualified him for the FIDE World Chess Championship 2000. Here he defeated Aleksandar Wohl in the first round and then lost to Alexander Beliavsky in the second, thus exiting the competition. Galkin competed in the FIDE World Championship again in 2004; this time he was eliminated in the first round by Aleksander Delchev. Three year later, Galkin participated in the FIDE World Cup; here he defeated Mateusz Bartel in round one and lost to Vassily Ivanchuk in round two. In 2011, Galkin played in the Russian Championship Superfinal.

References

External links 

Alexander Galkin games at 365Chess.com

1979 births
Living people
Chess grandmasters
Russian chess players
World Junior Chess Champions

Sportspeople from Rostov-on-Don